Mohammadabad (also Romanized as Moḩammadābād; also known as Moḩammad ‘Alī Khān (Persian: محمدعليخان), Qal‘eh-ye Moḩammad, and Qal‘eh-ye Moḩammad ‘Alī Khān) is a village in Ziarat Rural District, in the Central District of Shirvan County, North Khorasan Province, Iran. At the 2006 census, its population was 134, in 35 families.

References 

Populated places in Shirvan County